Dajan Shehi (born 19 March 1997), is an Albanian professional footballer who plays as a centre-back for KF Skënderbeu Korçë.

Club career

Early career
Shehi started his youth career at age of 15 with KF Elbasani in September 2012. In his first 2012–13 season with under-17 side he played 9 matches. In the next season he managed to appear for both under-17 & under-19 side playing 21 matches and scoring 1 goal for U17 and 6 matches for U19.

Elbasani
During the 2014–15 season he gained entry with the first team and made his debut on 17 May 2015 against Laçi playing the full 90-minutes match which finished in the 2–0 loss. He played another match for Elbasani and moved to Teuta Durrës during the Window Summer Transfers.

Teuta Durrës
He made it his debut for Teuta Durrës against Ada Velipojë on 16 September 2015, valid for the 2015–16 Albanian Cup, coming on as a substitute in the 60th minute in place of Nertil Ferraj, where the match finished in the 1–5 victory.

International career
He was called up for the first time at international level in the Albania national under-19 football team by coach Arjan Bellaj for two friendly matches against Kosovo U19 on 13 & 15 October 2015.

Career statistics

Club

References

External links

Dajan Sehi profile FSHF.org

1997 births
Living people
Footballers from Elbasan
Albanian footballers
Albanian expatriate footballers
Association football forwards
Kategoria Superiore players
Kategoria e Parë players
First Football League (Croatia) players
KF Elbasani players
KF Teuta Durrës players
Besa Kavajë players
KS Kastrioti players
KF Vllaznia Shkodër players
FK Partizani Tirana players
Albania youth international footballers
Albanian expatriate sportspeople in Croatia
Expatriate footballers in Croatia